Myrmecia callima is an Australian ant which belongs to the genus Myrmecia. This species is native to Australia. Myrmecia callima is typically distributed in the more western regions of Australia.

The average length for this species is around 12.5-14 millimetres long. Their head is black, antennae, thorax, node, and other features are a yellowish-red colour. Mandibles and legs are in a yellow colour.

References

Myrmeciinae
Hymenoptera of Australia
Insects described in 1943
Insects of Australia